Blood Sample is the 11th studio album by the Finnish avant-garde progressive metal band Waltari.

Track listing

 "Helsinki" - 5:53
 "Not Enough" - 3:35
 "Too Much Emptiness" - 2:30
 "Never" - 4:01
 "New York" - 3:48
 "I'm in Pain" - 4:38
 "All Roads Will Lead to Rome" - 3:58
 "Digging Inside" - 8:05
 "Fly Into the Light" - 4:34
 "Shades to Grace" - 4:57
 "Aching Eyes" - 5:41
 "Back to the Audio" - 7:38
 "Pigeons" - 5:16
 "Exterminator Warheads" - 2:01
 "Darling Boy" - 4:23
 "Wide Awake" - 5:00
 "Julia" - 2:52   (cover from the Beatles)

Credits
Kärtsy Hatakka - Vocals, bass, Keyboards 
Sami Yli-Sirniö - Guitar
Jari Lehtinen - Guitar
Ville Vehviläinen - Drums

Charts

References

External links
Encyclopaedia Metallum page

Waltari albums
2005 albums